Counterfeit Cat is an animated television series produced by Wildseed Kids for Teletoon and Disney XD. The series revolves around the friendship of Max (Marc Wootton), a lazy yellow housecat, and Gark (Alex Kelly), an alien who disguises himself in a purple knitted cat costume to blend in. Gark originally crashed down to Earth in his spaceship and landed in the laundry room of Betty (Kayvan Novak), an old woman who is Max's owner. Gark believes that Max is a tiger, the bravest species on Earth, despite Max's cowardice. The two often find themselves in surreal and dangerous situations due to Gark's unstable alien powers, which Max often uses to his own advantage without thinking of the consequences.

Series overview

Episodes 
Note: All episodes are directed by Ben Marsaud

Shorts

References

External links
 
 

Lists of British animated television series episodes
Lists of Canadian children's animated television series episodes